After World War II, socialist realism, like in the Soviet Union, was adopted by a number of new communist states in Eastern Europe, including Romania. This was accompanied by a series of organizational moves, such as the incarceration of numerous poets linked to the fascist paramilitary organization, the Iron Guard. Between 1948 and 1956, Romania's pre-existing system of values and corresponding cultural institutions were restructured in an attempt to create a "new socialist man". As in the political and economic spheres, cultural reforms were sometimes forcibly imposed, intellectuals' links with the West were severed, and the Romanian Academy and long-standing professional organizations such as the Society of Romanian Writers or the Society of Romanian Composers were dissolved and replaced with new ones, from which anti-communist members were removed. The works of antisemitic authors, such as Octavian Goga, Nichifor Crainic and Mircea Vulcănescu, were also banned.

In literature

Three articles signed by Sorin Toma were published in Scînteia. Titled "The Poetry of Putrefaction or the Putrefaction of Poetry", they dealt with the poetic works of Tudor Arghezi. The articles marked a complete break with interwar values: "With a foul-smelling vocabulary [...], Arghezi does in poetry only what Picasso did in painting, introducing excrement as artistic material... One finds bits of real beauty here and there in Arghezi's poetry." In 1950, the Mihai Eminescu School of Literature was founded, with the aim of forming a new generation of writers in the Romanian People's Republic. In an article published inViaţa Românească (no. 3, 1951), Mihai Beniuc, a member of the Writers' Union of Romania, offered a definition of the socialist-realist poet: "He must be a philosopher familiar with the most profound ideas of the age [...], toward which Marx, Engels, Lenin and Stalin opened the way [...], and an activist in service of those ideas."

Newly appeared literary critics, guided by Leonte Răutu, published studies in the spirit of the socialist realist doctrine. These included Ovid S. Crohmălniceanu—Un roman al industrializării socialiste ("A Novel of Socialist Industrialization"), Silvian Iosifescu—Pe drumul înfloririi gospodăriei agricole colective ("On the Road to the Flowering of the Administration of Collective Agriculture"), Mihai Gafiţa—Romanul luptei tractoriştilor ("The Novel of the Tractor-Drivers' Struggle"), Nestor Ignat—O carte despre frumuseţea vieţii noi ("A Book about the Beauty of the New Life"), Mihai Novicov—Pe marginea poeziei lui Dan Deşliu ("On the Margin of the Poetry of Dan Deşliu"), Traian Şelmaru—Mitrea Cocor de Mihail Sadoveanu ("Mitrea Cocor by Mihail Sadoveanu") and Ion Vitner—Poezia lui A. Toma ("The Poetry of A. Toma").

Prose works

A few representative examples:

 Mihail Sadoveanu: Fantezii răsăritene ("Eastern Fantasies"; 1946), Păuna Mică ("The Little Peahen", 1948), Mitrea Cocor  1950), a novel that became a symbol of socialist-realist prose, with its depiction of class struggle, of positive heroes, of the Communist ironworker Florea Costea and the boiler-maker Voicu Cernea, of the moral and ideological transformation of Mitrea during his imprisonment in the Soviet Union.
 Zaharia Stancu, first de facto president of the newly founded Writers' Union of Romania (1949): the novel Desculţ ("Barefoot; first edition, 1948).
 Alexandru Jar: Sfârşitul jalbelor ("The End of Complaints"; 1950), Marea pregătire ("The Great Preparation"; 1952), novels about the Griviţa Strike of 1933 that followed the class-struggle pattern and gave its own historical truth.
 Petru Dumitriu: Drum fără pulbere ("Road without Dust") and Pasărea furtunii ("The Bird of the Storm"), novels that hailed the achievements realised while digging the Danube-Black Sea Canal, known even at the time as a harsh political prison.
 Eusebiu Camilar: the novel Negura ("The Fog"; 1949), a book filled with barbarism, stupidity and cruelty, all ascribed to the Romanian Army during its participation in the Nazi-led invasion of the Soviet Union.
 Eugen Barbu: author of the novels Groapa ("The Pit"; 1957) and Şoseaua Nordului ("The Highway of the North").

Poetry 

With verses like "imperialist american/cădea-ţi-ar bomba în ocean" ("American imperialist/May your bomb fall into the ocean"), Alexandru Toma was an official model for socialist realist Romanian poets until his death in 1954.

Other important representatives of socialist realist poetry, who included slogans of the Romanian Communist Party into their own verses, included:

 Dan Deşliu: Cântec pentru tovarăşul plan ("Song for Comrade Plan"), and Lazăr de la Rusca ("Lazăr of Rusca"), both massive poems that appeared on two pages of Scînteia.
 Victor Tulbure: Balada tovarăşului căzut împărţind Scînteia în ilegalitate ("Ballad of the Comrade Who Fell while Illegally Distributing Scînteia").
 Marcel Breslaşu: Cîntec de leagăn al Doncăi ("Donca's Lullaby").
 Mihai Beniuc: În frunte comuniştii ("Communists at the forefront"), Cântec pentru tovarăşul Gheorghiu-Dej ("Song for Comrade Gheorghiu-Dej, Partidul m-a învăţat ("The Party Taught Me").

Other poets who practiced the style include: Eugen Frunză, Miron Radu Paraschivescu, Nina Cassian (An viu, nouă sute şi şaptesprezece — "Living Year, Nine Hundred and Seventeen), Ion Brad (Cincisutistul — "The Five Hundredist"), Veronica Porumbacu (Tovarăşul Matei a primit Ordinul Muncii — "Comrade Matei Has Received the Order of Labour"), Maria Banuş (Ţie-ţi vorbesc, Americă! — "I Am Speaking to You, America!"), Ştefan Iureş (Ucenicul Partidului — "The Disciple of the Party"), Virgil Teodorescu and Mihu Dragomir.

Drama 

A militant theatre was conceived, with an active presence in the ongoing class struggle and solidarity with the entire people around the ideals of the Communist Party. Notable examples include:

 Mihail Davidoglu: Omul din Ceatal ("The Man from Ceatal"), Minerii ("The Miners"), Cetatea de foc ("The Citadel of Fire").
 Aurel Baranga: Bal la Făgădău ("Ball at the Inn"; 1946) and, together with Nicolae Moraru, Anii negri ("The Black Years").
 Maria Banuş: Ziua cea Mare ("The Great Day"), the first play about the newly collectivised Romanian village.
 Lucia Demetrius: Cumpăna ("The Shadoof", 1949), Vadul nou ("The New Crossing", 1951), Oameni de azi ("People of Today", 1952).
 Alexandru Mirodan: Ziariştii ("The Newspapermen", 1956), Şeful sectorului suflete ("The Chief of the Souls' Sector", 1963).

Another characteristic of socialist realism was the necessity of a positive hero. Apparently, Ion Luca Caragiale's O scrisoare pierdută could not be staged due to the absence of such a hero.

Architecture 

Bucharest's Casa Scînteii is a signature example of a socialist-realist building in Romania.

Plastic arts 

Beginning in 1948, avant-garde currents of the first half of the 20th century, considered decadent and detached from reality, were rejected for their "bourgeois formalism". In 1949, the Plastic Artists' Cooperative was founded in Bucharest. There, promising young artists such as Ion Biţan, Traian Trestioreanu, Paul Gherasim, Virgil Almăşan and Ştefan Sevastre began to execute works of "visual agitation" and decoration, painting onto huge posters the portraits of the "four teachers" of Marxism-Leninism and of the heads of party and state in the Romanian People's Republic. As the state was the artists' sole patron, through the Plastic Fund, established artists began to adopt socialist realist themes in their work. Among them were Camil Ressu (Semnarea apelului pentru pace — "The Signing of the Peace Appeal"), Alexandru Ciucurencu (1 Mai — "May 1", Ana Ipătescu) and Corneliu Baba (Oţelari — "Steel-workers").

Other socialist-realist painters, with representative works, included:

Theodor Harşia (Şantierul de la Bicaz — "The Bicaz Construction Site"), Gavril Miklossy (Griviţa, 1933; Lupeni, 1929), Spiru Chintilă (Femei înarmate în gărzile patriotice — Women Armed in the Patriotic Guards"), Brăduţ Covaliu (Greva de la Lupeni — "The Lupeni Strike"), Insurecţia armată din 23 August 1944 — "The Armed Insurrection of 23 August 1944"), Constantin Piliuţă (Revoluţonari încarceraţi — "Incarcerated Revolutionaries"), Gheorghe Iacob (Propagandist de partid la sat — "Party Propagandist in the Village"), Coriolan Hora (Sudorii — "The Welders", Recoltarea porumbului — "The Corn Harvest"), Ion Biţan (Recolta — "The Harvest", Victoria — "The Victory"), Gheorghe Şaru (Sudoriţă — "The Female Welder"), Ştefan Szöny (Tipografie clandestină — "Clandestine Typography", Moartea partizanului — "The Death of the Partisan"), Iulia Hălăucescu (Centrala hidroelectrică V.I. Lenin — "The V.I. Lenin Hydroelectric Plant").

Emil Mereanu executed two notable sculptures in the style: a bust of Andrei Zhdanov for the Ştefan Gheorghiu Academy and a work called Bucurie ("Joy") in Floreasca Park, Bucharest.

In music

In 1949, the Society of Romanian Composers was dissolved and replaced with the Romanian Composers' Union. Some composers, considered reactionaries, collaborators with the previous fascist regimes, and formalists were excluded from the new organization: Mihail Jora, Ionel Perlea, Stan Golestan, Dinu Lipatti (dubbed "a fascist who vegetates far from his country"), Tiberiu Brediceanu, and Dimitrie Cuclin. Of George Enescu's works, only his two Romanian Rhapsodies were performed; certain composers like Richard Wagner were no longer played in concert or on the air; religious-themed music was no longer played; while jazz was labelled an expression of American imperialism, on the same level as chewing gum and Coca-Cola. The head of the Union was Matei Socor (later Director of Radio Transmission and permanent Director of the Symphony Radio Orchestra), who wrote the music for Communist Romania's first two national anthems, "Zdrobite cătuşe" (1948; words by Aurel Baranga) and "Te slăvim, Românie" (1953; words by Eugen Frunză and Dan Deşliu). Composers were called on to write engaged, Party-oriented, and revolutionary works. In the report of the constituent session, Socor underlined that "the tasks of the Composers' Union are clear as regards the re-education of certain artists accustomed to bourgeois aestheticizing criteria" and asked for "the imposition of the Party spirit in music". Vocal-symphonic pieces were preferred, such as the oratorio Tudor Vladimirescu by Gheorghe Dumitrescu or the cantata for choir and orchestra Se construieşte lumea nouă ("The New World Is Being Built") by George Draga, as well as revolutionary hymns such as "Îi mulţumim din inimă partidului" ("We Thank the Party from the Depths of our Hearts"), "Hei rup!" ("Heave-Ho!") or "Întreceri, întreceri, ciocane şi seceri" ("Contests, Contests, Hammers and Sickles").

In the light or easy listening categories, hits included "Drag îmi e bădiţa cu tractorul" ("Sweet Little Fellow on a Tractor"), "Macarale râd în soare argintii" ("Silver Cranes Laughing in the Sun") and "Hai Leano la vot!" ("Come and Vote, Leana!").

1960s-1989

After the death of Joseph Stalin and the consequent process of de-Stalinization in the Soviet Union and allied states, socialist realism began to lose its popularity. Many Romanian and Western authors, their works previously banned, were "reconsidered" and published in critical editions. A new generation of writers, heralded by Nicolae Labiş but reaching fruition with Nichita Stănescu and Marin Sorescu, protested vehemently against ideological dogmatism and called for full artistic liberty. Styles and genres of literature, plastic arts and music began to loosen in the early 1960s, while still maintaining the core principles of Communism and adherence to Party policy. However, this trend came to an abrupt halt with the July Theses of 1971, after which General Secretary Ceauşescu began not only to repress dissidents such as Paul Goma and Mircea Dinescu, but also to promote his own personality cult. Manifestations of this era of reborn socialist realism could be found in painting, architecture (the Palace of the Parliament), writing (the poems of Corneliu Vadim Tudor) music (Adrian Păunescu's Cenaclul Flacăra events) and other areas. Socialist realism ended in Romania with the 1989 Revolution.

See also
 Zhdanov Doctrine

Bibliography

 Mircea Zaciu, Marian Papahagi, Aurel Sasu: Dicţionarul scriitorilor români. Editura Fundaţiei Culturale Române, Bucharest, 1995
 Eugen Simion (coord.): Dicţionarul General al Literaturii Române. Editura Univers Enciclopedic, Bucharest, 2005
 Michel Aucouturier: Realismul socialist. Editura Dacia, Bucharest, 2001
 Florin Mihăilescu: De la proletcultism la postmodernism. Editura Pontica, Constanţa, 2002
 Paul Cernat, Ion Manolescu, Angelo Mitchievici, Ioan Stanomir, Explorări în comunismul românesc vol.1 (Polirom, 2004)  and vol.2 (Polirom, 2005)  
 Eugen Negrici: Poezia unei religii politice. Patru decenii de agitaţie şi propagandă, an anthology of socialist-realist poetry with a preface by Eugen Negrici, Editura Pro, 1995
 Eugen Negrici: Literatura română sub comunism. Proza, Editura Fundaţiei Pro, 2002 
 Eugen Negrici: Literatura română sub comunism. Poezia, Editura Fundaţiei Pro, 2003
 Joel Crotty, "A Preliminary Investigation of Music, Socialist Realism, and the Romanian Experience, 1948-1959: (Re)reading, (Re)listening, and (Re)writing Music History for a Different Audience", Journal of Musicological Research, Apr2007, Vol. 26, Issue 2/3, p.151–176. 

Romania
Socialist Republic of Romania
Romanian culture